The Isle of Man, in the Irish Sea between Great Britain and Ireland, has been home to various notable people, including the following who were either born or raised on the island or moved there at some point.

Born on the island

Academics
Martin Bridson, FRS (born 1964), Whitehead Professor of Pure Mathematics at Oxford University, Head of the Clay Mathematics Institute.
Edward Forbes, FRS (1815 - 1854), Manx naturalist, mentor to Thomas Henry Huxley, and first Manx Fellow of The Royal Society

Actors
Samantha Barks (born 1990)
Jamie Blackley (born 1991)
Amy Jackson (born 1991)
Harry Korris (1891–1971)
Joe Locke (born 2003)
Dursley McLinden (19651995)
Geraldine Somerville (born 1967)

Artists
Rayner Hoff (1894–1937), sculptor, known for his architectural sculptures of war memorials in Australia.
William Hoggatt (1879–1961), artist who moved to the Isle of Man in 1907
Bryan Kneale RA (born 1930), sculptor, known for teaching art in London and his works are exhibited in many countries around the world.
Archibald Knox (1864–1933), art nouveau designer, known for his Celtic art and Liberty of London work.
Paul Lewthwaite (born 1969), sculptor, an elected Fellow of the Royal British Society of Sculptors.
Toni Onley (1928–2004), painter, born on the Isle of Man and moved to Canada in 1948.

Engineers and Inventors
William Kennish (1799–1862), engineer, inventor, scientist, poet and explorer. Known for his Royal Navy engineering work and surveying the Panama Canal.

Military
Major Robert Henry Cain VC (1909–1974), soldier, awarded the Victoria Cross during Operation Market Garden of the Second World War.

Musicians
Mel Collins (born 1947), saxophonist, known for his session work with acts such as King Crimson and Camel
Christine Collister (born 1961), contemporary folk singer
Beckii Cruel (born 1995), Japanese idol
Barry Gibb (born 1946), of the Bee Gees
Maurice Gibb (1949–2003), of the Bee Gees
Robin Gibb (1949–2012), of the Bee Gees
Davy Knowles (born 1987), blues guitarist and singer
Harry Manx (born 1955), musician who blends blues and Hindustani classical music
Tomas Callister (born 1993), fiddle player who plays manx music and other traditional celtic music

Rulers and Politicians
Illiam Dhône (also known as William Christian), (1608–1663), Manx patriot executed in 1663, great grandfather of Fletcher Christian.
Sir Charles Kerruish OBE LLD CP MLC (1917–2003), first non-gubernatorial head of the Manx executive.
Mark Wilks (1759–1831), Speaker of the House of Keys, later Governor of St Helena.

Sportspersons
Neil Bennett (born 1951), rugby union player, won 7 caps for the England rugby union team.
Mark Cavendish MBE (born 1985), road and track racing cyclist, winner of all Grand Tours points classifications and the 2011 UCI Road Race World Championships.
Conor Cummins (born 1986), motorcyclist, four Isle of Man TT podiums.
Zoe Gillings (born 1985), snowboarder, seven FIS Snowboard World Cup podiums and three-times British Olympian.
Mark Higgins (born 1971), rally driver, three-times winner of the British Rally Championship.
David Higgins (born 1972), rally driver, winner of the 2004 British Rally Championship.
Steve Joughin (born 1959), road racing cyclist, two-times winner of the British National Road Race Championships.
Peter Kennaugh MBE (born 1989), road and track racing cyclist, gold medallist at the 2012 Olympic Games and the 2012 UCI Track Cycling World Championships.
David Knight OBE (born 1978), motorcyclist, three-times winner of the World Enduro Championship.
Alex Lloyd (born 1984), motor racing driver, winner of the 2007 Indy Pro Series.
A.P. Penketh (1865–1932), rugby union player, took part in the 1888 British Lions tour to New Zealand and Australia.
Kieran Tierney, first-team footballer for Arsenal FC
Dave Molyneux,(Born 1963) (sidecar rider). 17 Isle of Man TT wins

TV and radio personalities
Dr. Brian Stowell (1936-2019), radio personality and author, instrumental in the revival of the Manx Gaelic language. Well known nuclear physicist.
Kevin Woodford (born 1950), TV chef and celebrity, presented Can't Cook, Won't Cook.

Writers
Thomas Edward Brown (1830–1897), poet, scholar, and theologian
Frank Kermode (1919–2010), noted literary critic
Nigel Kneale (1922–2006), screenwriter
Randolph Quirk (1920–2017), Lord Quirk, an eminent linguist

Other notable people
Ned Maddrell (1877–1974), last native speaker of the Manx language
Elizabeth Holloway Marston (1893–1993), credited with the invention of superhero Wonder Woman

Moved to the island
Trevor Baines (born 1939), businessman, jailed in 2009, for money laundering.
Lillian Beckwith, author.
Charles Birkin (1907–1986), 5th baronet and author.
"Big Clive" Mitchell (1965-present), Electrical Engineer and YouTube Personality who examines and conducts Product "teardowns" of consumer electronics and household products
Sir Thomas Henry Hall Caine, a British novelist and playwright.
Lord Cockfield (1916–2007), was born at Horsham in Sussex, England; but in later life had a house on the Isle of Man.
Cal Crutchlow, motorbike racer
George Daniels, noted horologist.
Roly Drower (1953–2008), activist, broadcaster, musician and poet
Florrie Forde (1876–1940), known as The Queen of Music Hall.
George MacDonald Fraser, journalist, author, and screenwriter.
Gerald Gardner, Father of Modern Wicca owned Witches Mill in Castletown.
Russell Grant, television personality, astrologer, writer.
Albert Gubay (1928–2016), businessman, founder of supermarket chain Kwik Save.
Trevor Hemmings (1935-2021), businessman, famously owned Blackpool Tower.
John Hick MP, JP (1815–1894), engineer, industrialist, art collector, politician and a director of the London North Western Railway.
William Hillary (1771–1847), founder of the Royal National Lifeboat Institution and also arranged for The Tower of Refuge to be built in Douglas Harbour.
Neil Hodgson, the  Superbike World Champion.
Rick Holden, manager of Peel football club on the Isle of Man; player with Oldham Athletic (twice) and Manchester City.
Sheila Holland (1937–2000), prolific and best-selling romantic novelist, best known as Charlotte Lamb.
Colin Horsley (1920–2012), New Zealand-born classical pianist but with Manx roots
Andy Kershaw, BBC Radio presenter.
Rupert de Larrinaga, British Olympic skier.
Cynthia Lennon, artist, writer and celebrity, ex-wife of former Beatle John Lennon, moved to the island in 1983 with her then husband Jim Christie. She and Christie lived there for several years.
Nigel Mansell, British racing driver.
Mitch Murray, songwriter, record producer.
Bill Naughton, novelist and screenwriter.
Chris Norman, songwriter, member of soft rock group Smokie.
Andrew Pitt, World Supersport champion and MotoGP rider.
John Rhys-Davies, Welsh actor.
Ronnie Ronalde, Music Hall performer.
Alan Ruddock (1944–2012), schoolteacher, 6th Dan Aikidoka, introduced that martial art to Ireland, Aiki no Michi founder.
Robert Sangster (1936–2004), businessman, racehorse owner/breeder.
Mark Shuttleworth (born 1973), businessman, Spaceflight participant, and sponsor of Ubuntu Linux.
Roger W. Smith, noted horologist.
Mollie Sugden (1922–2009), actress.
James Toseland, the double Superbike World Champion and former MotoGP rider.
Adam Wakeman, musician and son of Rick Wakeman.
Rick Wakeman, keyboard player in Yes and The Strawbs.
Alan Warner, novelist and screenwriter.
Thomas "Buck" Whaley, member of the Irish House of Commons.
John Whittaker (born 1942), businessman and property mogul, is chairman of The Peel Group which owns various properties (including the Trafford Centre and Liverpool John Lennon Airport).
Sir Norman Wisdom (1915–2010), comedian and actor.

References

See also
List of Manx people

Manx people
Isle of Man-related lists